The 2022 Taipei Marathon（）was a Elite Label marathon race held in Taipei, Taiwan on December 18, 2022. It is the 26th running of the race.

In this edition of the race, half marathon added wheelchair demonstration for the first time, invited 15 domestic para athletes to join.

Background 

The slogan of the race is "Run the city, we are possible" and been announced on its official Facebook in August 2022.

On August 29, 2022, the race officially opens its registration at the press conference, the field is limited to 28,000 runners. Rendy Lu, retired Taiwanese professional tennis player, will also join the half marathon as the race ambassador.

Prize

Elite runners 
Ethiopian long-distance runners Demeke Kasaw Biksegn and Alemtsehay Asifa Kasegn are both returned as reigning champion this year. Biksegn finishing the race with a time of 2:11:42 last year.

Results

Marathon

Half marathon

Annotation

References

External links 
 Official website

Taipei Marathon
Taipei
2022 in Taiwanese sport